In fluid dynamics, wave shoaling is the effect by which surface waves, entering shallower water, change in wave height. It is caused by the fact that the group velocity, which is also the wave-energy transport velocity, changes with water depth. Under stationary conditions, a decrease in transport speed must be compensated by an increase in energy density in order to maintain a constant energy flux. Shoaling waves will also exhibit a reduction in wavelength while the frequency remains constant.

In other words, as the waves approach the shore and the water gets shallower, the waves get taller, slow down, and get closer together.

In shallow water and parallel depth contours, non-breaking waves will increase in wave height as the wave packet enters shallower water. This is particularly evident for tsunamis as they wax in height when approaching a coastline, with devastating results.

Overview

Waves nearing the coast change wave height through different effects. Some of the important wave processes are refraction, diffraction, reflection, wave breaking, wave–current interaction, friction, wave growth due to the wind, and wave shoaling. In the absence of the other effects, wave shoaling is the change of wave height that occurs solely due to changes in mean water depth – without changes in wave propagation direction and dissipation. Pure wave shoaling occurs for long-crested waves propagating perpendicular to the parallel depth contour lines of a mildly sloping sea-bed. Then the wave height  at a certain location can be expressed as:

with  the shoaling coefficient and  the wave height in deep water. Deep water means that the waves are (hardly) affected by the sea bed, which occurs when the depth  is larger than about half the deep-water wavelength

Physics

For non-breaking waves, the energy flux associated with the wave motion, which is the product of the wave energy density with the group velocity, between two wave rays is a conserved quantity (i.e. a constant when following the energy of a wave packet from one location to another). Under stationary conditions the total energy transport must be constant along the wave ray – as first shown by William Burnside in 1915.
For waves affected by refraction and shoaling (i.e. within the geometric optics approximation), the rate of change of the wave energy transport is:

A decrease in group speed  and distance between the wave rays  must be compensated by an increase in energy density . This can be formulated as a shoaling coefficient relative to the wave height in deep water.

For shallow water, when the wavelength is much larger than the water depth – in case of a constant ray distance  (i.e. perpendicular wave incidence on a coast with parallel depth contours) – wave shoaling satisfies Green's law:

with  the mean water depth,  the wave height and  the fourth root of

Water wave refraction
Following Phillips (1977) and Mei (1989), denote the phase of a wave ray as 
. 
The local wave number vector is the gradient of the phase function, 
, 
and the angular frequency is proportional to its local rate of change, 
. 
Simplifying to one dimension and cross-differentiating it is now easily seen that the above definitions indicate simply that the rate of change of wavenumber is balanced by the convergence of the frequency along a ray; 
. 
As waves enter shallower waters, the decrease in group velocity caused by the reduction in water depth leads to a reduction in wave length  because the nondispersive shallow water limit of the dispersion relation for the wave phase speed, 

dictates that 
,
i.e., a steady increase in k (decrease in ) as the phase speed decreases under constant .

See also

Notes

External links

Wave transformation at Coastal Wiki

Coastal geography
Physical oceanography
Water waves
Oceanographical terminology